Marcelo Arévalo and Miguel Ángel Reyes-Varela were the defending champions but chose not to defend their title.

Philipp Oswald and Filip Polášek won the title after defeating Guido Andreozzi and Guillermo Durán 7–5, 6–2 in the final.

Seeds

Draw

References

External links
 Main draw

Lisboa Belém Open - Doubles
2019 Doubles
2019 Lisboa Belém Open